Our Lady of the Rosary Cathedral, also called Paraná Cathedral, is the main Catholic church in the city of Parana, Entre Rios Province, in the South American country of Argentina.

It is located on the street S.S. Francisco (formerly Monte Caseros) between Urquiza and 25 de Mayo streets, in front of the 1 de Mayo Square.

The building, in eclectic style, has two towers and a dome, three naves and at the entrance a statue of St. Peter. It was declared a national historic heritage, so it is one of the most recognized buildings among the city's inhabitants and a popular tourist attraction.

See also
Roman Catholicism in Argentina
List of cathedrals in Argentina
Our Lady of the Rosary

References

Roman Catholic cathedrals in Argentina
Buildings and structures in Entre Ríos Province
Paraná, Entre Ríos